The 1984 Akron Zips football team represented Akron University in the 1984 NCAA Division I-AA football season as a member of the Ohio Valley Conference. Led by 12th-year head coach Jim Dennison, the Zips played their home games at the Rubber Bowl in Akron, Ohio. They finished the season with a record of 4–7 overall and 2–5 in OVC play, placing sixth.

Schedule

References

Akron
Akron Zips football seasons
Akron Zips football